

Deera Square is a public space in Deera, Riyadh, Saudi Arabia. It is also known as Justice Square, and derisively as Chop Chop Square by Western visitors.  It is a former site of public executions, where those sentenced to death in Saudi Arabia were publicly beheaded. 

At unannounced times, Saudi security forces and other officials cleared the area to make way for the execution to take place. After the beheading of the condemned, the head is stitched to the body, which is wrapped up and taken away for the final rites. It is a crime to record, with photos or videos, the executions, despite the number of attendees witnessing such public events.

Gallery

See also
 Capital punishment in Saudi Arabia

References

External links
 

Buildings and structures in Riyadh
Geography of Riyadh
Capital punishment in Saudi Arabia
Execution sites
Squares in Asia